The 2009 Acropolis Rally of Greece was the 56th running of the Acropolis Rally and the seventh round of the 2009 World Rally Championship season. The rally consisted of 17 special stages. Ford's Mikko Hirvonen took his first win of the season and Citroën Junior Team's Sébastien Ogier his first-ever podium position. Hirvonen's teammate Jari-Matti Latvala climbed back to third place after going off the road and dropping from first to 11th place on the first day.

Citroën's championship leader Sébastien Loeb crashed out from third place, and Dani Sordo broke his suspension while running second, right behind Hirvonen. Stobart M-Sport Ford's fifth-placed driver Henning Solberg crashed into the same rock as Sordo and also retired. Petter Solberg found himself Hirvonen's main challenger for the win, but also had to retire with a broken suspension.

With mechanical problems for Mads Østberg and Evgeny Novikov, who took his first-ever stage win in the event, Federico Villagra finished fourth, Conrad Rautenbach fifth and Khalid al-Qassimi sixth, which marked his career-best result. Østberg climbed back into the points on the last stage. Home country's Lambros Athanassoulas edged out Nasser Al-Attiyah to win the Production World Rally Championship category, and also collected a WRC point for eighth place overall.

Results

Special stages

Championship standings after the event

Drivers' championship

Manufacturers' championship

References

External links 
 Official site

Acropolis
Acropolis Rally
Acropolis Rally